Torkom Saraydarian (1917–1997) was an Armenian author, poet, and musician. He was born in Sevas, Turkey to Armenian parents. He was trained in The Ageless Wisdom Teachings under the guidance of his father, Monasteries, Arcane School.

He visited monasteries, temples and mystery schools seeking answers to his questions about the mystery of man and the universe. He was musically trained and played the violin, piano, oud, cello and guitar. He composed hundreds of musical pieces.

His works represent a synthesis of sacred culture of the world by creating a truly universal approach to spirituality. His written legacy spans over 170 books (half of which have been published), hundreds of musical pieces and lectures.

Early life 

At age nine, Torkom began to receive education in the Ageless Wisdom under his father's guidance. At that time, people attended meetings — in caves or under the stars — to hold ceremonies and dramatizations to reveal the world's mysteries.

United States 

In 1959, he moved to the US with his family from Jordan. He began inviting people into his home in Van Nuys, California to learn how to live more productive, healthy, right lives via the principles of Ageless Wisdom. This was the inception of the Aquarian Educational Group (AEG). At AEG's 35th anniversary celebration in Agoura, California he stated:

Now, how we started this group. This group was started in 1961 — unofficially. One day I was coming home from the church. I saw 15 boys sitting and doping themselves. All my neighbors — very beautiful boys and girls. When I saw them doping and smoking, my heart broke. I said, 'Don't they have fathers, don't they have mothers?' Because I was from the old country and could not understand America. (That was not America, but I say 'America'.) I couldn't understand how people could drug themselves and dope themselves. So I went home, I meditated, I thought. I said, "We must form a group to bring all these children in and slowly educate them."

For ten years, he taught classes and lectured in a one-room garage without a salary except for small donations left by students.

Teachings

Torkom Saraydarian's seven principles of right living are Beauty, Goodness, Righteousness, Joy, Freedom, Striving and Sacrificial Service.

We are an international group in which everyone can take part because it is the principles that give life — not religions.

We didn't build a religion. We didn't build hatred between people. We emphasized great principles and these great principles worked.

Through the practice of these principles, Torkom aimed to teach people how to be successful, co-operative, creative and have healthy, happy relationships.

Legacy 

Torkom taught for over 50 years in the US and internationally, and counseled thousands of people. He collected over 8,000 books, booklets, and periodicals and therewith formed the TS library. He presented thousands of lectures, seminars, and workshops in the US and internationally.

He wrote 170 books, of which some have been translated into Spanish, Portuguese, Italian, Greek, Armenian, Danish, Swedish, German, Yugoslavian, and Russian, as well as thousands of articles. He studied and wrote summaries of major books of the Wisdom Teachings, including The Secret Doctrine, The Bhagavad Gita, Treatise on Cosmic Fire, and the Agni Yoga Books. With Gita Saraydarian (his daughter) Torkom helped create the TSG Foundation as the major publishing house for his works.

He also created The Creative Trust with Gita to house his creative works and created meditation courses and spiritual training curricula. TSG University curriculum was founded to promote his work.

TSG Foundation 

The TSG Foundation focuses on a comprehensive spiritual educational program of life enhancement teachings designed by Saraydarian.

TSG continues to be run by Gita Saraydarian. The Foundation's headquarters is in Cave Creek, Arizona. Its books, study courses, and seminars are distributed/conducted throughout the world.

The prime objective of the TSG Foundation's work is to help people to unfold their potentials; deepen their non-sectarian spiritual learning through practical, transformational processes; increase their capacity to serve others; and make their lives more beautiful. TSG provides progressive ideas — defined as those ideas which are designed for the betterment of human relationships and for humanity as a whole, through which a person is empowered to make better life choices.

The foundation claims that new education is found in new subject matter, not in new methods. TSG's subject matter involves principles and standards that can be applied by people of all backgrounds and cultures. It is designed to train the mind to think holistically. TSG labels this education 'living ethics'. This includes:

The science of Meditation
Understanding Karma and Reincarnation
Learning about the Divine source of all human beings
Higher Worlds of life and Divine guidance
The principles of Beauty, Goodness, Righteousness, Joy, and Freedom
Continuous improvement and growth through application of spiritual Teachings
Service for human welfare in all fields as a way of life
The development of true inner confidence
The healing of our physical, emotional, mental, and higher spiritual bodies
Understanding the flow of psychic energy
The science of the soul and the work of the Guardian Angel
The science of right human relations in marriage, friendships, and child rearing
Developing the power of the human soul

Publications

Music
Torkom composed and recorded hundreds of musical compositions and sacred songs.

The TSG University

The TSG University is a Spiritual Training Center for the systematic study of the Ageless Wisdom Teachings.

Students may study courses for self enrichment, take individual meditation courses, or follow a specific program for specialized training.

TSG University was founded by Gita Saraydarian. Classes began online and on-site in September 2000. The curriculum was created by Gita and is based on the many courses, classes, instructions, and visions of a specialized Spiritual University that Torkom discussed in his writings and speeches.

The university provides courses in meditation and intensive study of the esoteric Wisdom. All the courses provide opportunities for self-transformation. Students study the theory and practical application of the Ageless Wisdom Teachings and learn how to be transformed parents, partners, creative artists, leaders, healers, ministers, and teachers. Seminars and workshops in the United States and Europe provide additional opportunities for first-hand experience of the Sacred Teachings of the Ancient Sages.

Courses of study begin with a focus on the Ageless Wisdom Teachings of Torkom Saraydarian, and slowly expand to include reading and study from the books of Alice A. Bailey, Helena Roerich, and H. P. Blavatsky and others from a wide variety of scholarly literature in comparative religions and spirituality.

Courses help the participant to develop skills in observation, meditation, analytical and critical thinking, the development of virtues, and to becoming one's True Self.

The TSG University provides non-accredited certification as well as non-accredited degrees in BA, MA, and Ph.D. in spiritual and philosophical education.

References

External links
Related groups and Foundations:
 The TSG Foundation US

Educational institutions using his work:
 The Torkom Saraydarian University

1917 births
1997 deaths
Jordanian emigrants to the United States